Theresa Weir (born 1954), better known by her pen name Anne Frasier, is an American author of numerous genres.

Biography 
Anne Frasier was born in Burlington, Iowa and attended Artesia High School in Artesia, New Mexico. Her parents divorced when she was six years old. The next twelve years of her life were spent in poverty, moving to and from Florida, Iowa, California, Illinois, and New Mexico. After graduating she worked as a waitress, a factory worker at Albuquerque's Levi Strauss where she sewed the Levi's logo on the back pockets of jeans, followed by a secretarial position at Wally's LP Gas in Santa Fe, New Mexico. She has started writing in her early twenties.

At age 21 she married her late husband whom she had met while working at her uncle's bar in Illinois. After marrying, she and her husband, who had a background in agriculture, moved to an apple farm. In an interview with Huffpost Frasier stated how "[she] had this idealized notion of getting back to nature and the land. I imagined myself barefoot with a baby on my hip, raising crops and canning organic vegetables."
However, she soon grew dispirited due to the ill effects of pesticides and the helplessness she experienced because of her inability to "[...] do anything about it".

Frasier credits these negative feelings, as well as general isolation, as the spark that prompted her to start writing genre fiction. As an unpublished author without college education, she did not know anything about submitting manuscripts. According to Frasier, she began mailing manuscripts to publishing house addresses she found in books. Her first sale was to the American publishing company Simon & Schuster; The Forever Man was published on April 28, 1988 by the Silhouette Book Publishing Division of Simon & Schuster, which specialised in romance novels. The Forever Man, which was published under the name Theresa Weir, is now out-of-print and has been removed from her bibliography on her official website, annefrasier.com.

After writing fiction spanning numerous genres for over 20 decades, she textualised her experience of American farm life during the 1980s in her memoir The Orchard. Additionally, her second memoir The Man Who Left chronicles her strained relationship to her father, who had left the family when she was five years old and later developed Alzheimers.

As of 2022, Frasier lives in Southern California with her dog and frequently shares insights into her personal life as well as her stance on environmentalism via instagram. She has previously stated that she is "addicted" to Facebook and Instagram.

Career 
Since the publication of her first novel, The Forever Man in 1988, Frasier has written over 40 novels, novellas, short stories, and anthologies under both her real name, Theresa Weir, as well as her more commonly used pseudonym Anne Frasier. During her early career Frasier wrote exclusively under the name Theresa Weir and specialised in romance novels, such as her 1988 novel Amazon Lily, which won the Romantic Times Best New Adventure Writer Award and was a RITA finalist.

In the year 2002 her novel Hush was published. This was the first instance of her using the pen name Anne Frasier.

In 2014, Frasier stated in an interview that she has written so many different genres that her "[...] brand was diluted." In an earlier interview from 1998, she had already talked about taking an unconventional approach to writing romance fiction. This was due to the fact that, while writing, she did not adhere to the conventions of the romance genre but rather wrote what she thought herself and a potential reader would enjoy. According to Frasier this had led to a lack of success in finding a publisher for her book, Amazon Lily. According to publishers, her main hero was "unlikable" and therefore would not fare well on the market.

Even after the success of Amazon Lily, Frasier still was met with hostility from editors and publishers when querying her books. Her characterisation of dark subject matters such as traumatic experiences, eating disorders or phobias led to her publishers eventually asking her to "[...] remove the blood and bodies" from her books. Instead she decided to take the opposite approach and removed the romance elements. Her first psychological suspense novel Before I Wake was published on January 1, 2005 under the name Anne Frasier. She has continued to write romance novels under her real name, Theresa Weir, but has stated in 2016 that she considers herself a crime fiction writer first and foremost.

Frasier is a member of Sisters in Crime and International Thriller writers. She served as a hardcover judge for the Thriller category presented by International Thriller writers, and was a guest of honour at the Diversicon 16 mystery and science fiction conference held in Minneapolis in 2008. Additionally, she was a judge in the International Thriller Writer's 2005 Best Novel contest.

Her titles have been translated in over 20 languages.

She credits Dr. Seuss, Night of the Living Dead, Texas Chainsaw Massacre, Nosferatu, as well as the works of Alfred Hitchcock and other black and white horror movies as influences on her career as an author.

Her next novel Found Object is set to be released on October 18, 2022.

Bibliography 

as Theresa Weir

as Anne Frasier

References

External links 
 Official Website
 Interview with WritersNewsWeekly

20th-century American novelists
21st-century American novelists
American thriller writers
Living people
Place of birth missing (living people)
American women novelists
RITA Award winners
Women thriller writers
Women romantic fiction writers
20th-century American women writers
21st-century American women writers
1954 births